"Snake Skin Shoes" is a song by Australian blues and rock band The Black Sorrows. It was released as the first single from their eighth studio album Lucky Charm. The song became the group's second top twenty single, peaking at number 16 on the ARIA Charts in August 1994.

Track listing
CD single (Columbia – 660475 2)
 "Snake Skin Shoes"
 "When It All Comes Down"	
 "Nobody Can Tell"
 "Down to the Sea"

Charts

Weekly charts

References

1994 songs
1994 singles
The Black Sorrows songs
Songs written by Joe Camilleri
Song recordings produced by Joe Camilleri